Qataghan-Badakhshan Province was a province located in Afghanistan. The province was originally created in 1890 when the districts of Qataghan and Badakhshan was separated from the Afghan Turkestan province. Administration of the province was assigned to the Northern Bureau in Kabul. 

In 1963 Badakhshan included the districts of Baghlan, Pul-i-Khumri, Dushi, Dahan-i-Ghori, Khan Abad, Andarab, Kunduz, Hazrat-i-Imam, and Taloqan. In 1963 Qataghan-Badakhshan Province was abolished and since then the territory was divided into four separate provinces - Badakhshan, Baghlan, Kunduz, and Takhar.

See also 
 Qataghan Province

References 

States and territories established in 1890
States and territories disestablished in 1963
Subdivisions of Afghanistan
Former provinces of Afghanistan
History of Baghlan Province
History of Kunduz Province
History of Takhar Province
History of Badakhshan Province